The 1932–33 Swiss National Ice Hockey Championship was the 23rd edition of the national ice hockey championship in Switzerland. HC Davos won the championship by finishing first in the final round.

First round

Eastern Series 
HC Davos qualified for the final round.

Central Series 
Zürcher SC qualified for the final round.

Western Series 
HC Chateaux d'Oex qualified for the final round as the only team in the Western Series.

Final round

External links 
Swiss Ice Hockey Federation – All-time results

National
Swiss National Ice Hockey Championship seasons